Ivie Okujaye Egboh (born 16 May 1987) is a Nigerian actress, film producer, scriptwriter, dancer, singer and activist. In 2009, she participated and won the Amstel Malta Box Office (AMBO) reality TV show. She is sometimes called little Genevieve because she resembles actress Genevieve Nnaji. She was awarded Best Young Actor at the 8th Africa Movie Academy Awards.

Personal life 
She was born in Benin City to a Delta State father and an Edo State mother. She is the last of 5 children. She has often stated that her parents wanted her to study medicine due to the presence of several medical practitioners in her family. She spent the first 10 years of her life in Benin before settling in Abuja. She had her primary education at Our Ladies of Apostle Private School. She attended Queen's College, Lagos before studying Economics at the University of Abuja.

She married Ezie Egboh in 2015.

Career 
She had been performing on stage years before her Nollywood debut. According to her, featuring in the Amstel Malta Box Office launched her career and paved the way for her first feature film, Alero’s Symphony.

Filmography

TV Shows

Awards

See also
 List of Nigerian film producers
List of Nigerian actors

References 

21st-century Nigerian actresses
1987 births
Living people
Actresses from Benin City
Nigerian activists
Musicians from Benin City
21st-century Nigerian women singers
Nigerian film producers
University of Abuja alumni
Most Promising Actor Africa Movie Academy Award winners
AMVCA Trailblazer Award winners
Nigerian female dancers
Nigerian singers
Nigerian film award winners
Nigerian screenwriters
Queen's College, Lagos alumni
Participants in Nigerian reality television series